Mary Louise Latham Taylor (born 7 October 2004) is an English cricketer who currently plays for Sussex and Southern Vipers. She plays as a right-handed batter and right-arm medium bowler.

Early life
Taylor attended Bede's School in Eastbourne alongside her twin sister, Millie, who also plays for Sussex.

Domestic career
Taylor made her county debut in 2021, for Sussex against Essex, taking 1/6 from her three overs. That season in the Women's Twenty20 Cup, she scored 52 runs and took 5 wickets at an average of 19.00. She played six matches for the side in the 2022 Women's Twenty20 Cup.

Taylor was named in the Southern Vipers Academy squad for 2021. She was again named in the Academy squad in 2022, and scored 110 for the Vipers 2nd XI against South East Stars 2nd XI in August. She was added to the first team squad in September 2022. She made her debut for Southern Vipers on 21 September 2022, in the Rachael Heyhoe Flint Trophy against South East Stars, taking 2/22 from her five overs.

International career
In October 2022, Taylor was selected as a non-travelling reserve in the England Under-19 squad for the 2023 ICC Under-19 Women's T20 World Cup.

References

External links

2004 births
Living people
Place of birth missing (living people)
Sussex women cricketers
Southern Vipers cricketers